Poland competed at the 1980 Winter Olympics in Lake Placid, United States.

Cross-country skiing

Men

Ice hockey

First Round - Red Division

All times are local (UTC-5).

Nordic combined 

Events:
 normal hill ski jumping (Three jumps, best two counted and shown here.)
 15 km cross-country skiing

Ski jumping

Speed skating

Men

Women

References
Official Olympic Reports
 Olympic Winter Games 1980, full results by sports-reference.com

Nations at the 1980 Winter Olympics
1980
1980 in Polish sport